Liesette Bruinsma (born 9 September 2000) is a Dutch Paralympic swimmer. She competes in S11 classification events for athletes with visual impairments. She is the 2016 double Paralympic champion within her classification. She competed at the 2020 Summer Paralympics, in Women's 400 metre freestyle S11, and Women's 100 metre freestyle S11, winning silver medals.

Swimming career
Bruinsma first competed for the Netherlands at Glasgow in 2014. Her first major international competition was the 2016 IPC Swimming European Championships in Funchal, where she competed in six events, and took a medal in five of them. Three of her Funchal medal's were gold: 400 m freestyle (S11), 100 m breaststroke (SB11) and the 200 m find. medley (SM11).

In the same year, Bruinsma made her Paralympic Games debut, winning five medals including two golds in the 200 metres individual medley and the 400 metres freestyle.

The Netherlands did not send a team to the 2017 World Para Swimming Championships in Mexico city, but Bruinsma dominated at the 2018 World Para Swimming European Championships, winning four gold medals and breaking two world records, taking her tally of European Championships titles to seven.

Controversies 
During the 2020 Summer Paralympics, Bruinsma raised protests against the victory of Chinese swimmers, the Paralympics organizing committee then accepted her protest and decided to cancel the competition. This has led to huge anger and protest in Chinese social media, especially when the two Chinese swimmers suffered from visual impairments as well. The competition was repeated on 29 August 2021, and the two Chinese swimmers won the gold and silver again while Bruinsma finished fourth.

References

External links 
 

2000 births
Living people
Dutch female breaststroke swimmers
Dutch female freestyle swimmers
Dutch female medley swimmers
Paralympic medalists in swimming
S11-classified Paralympic swimmers
Paralympic gold medalists for the Netherlands
Paralympic silver medalists for the Netherlands
Paralympic bronze medalists for the Netherlands
Swimmers at the 2016 Summer Paralympics
Swimmers at the 2020 Summer Paralympics
Medalists at the 2016 Summer Paralympics
Medalists at the 2020 Summer Paralympics
Medalists at the World Para Swimming Championships
Medalists at the World Para Swimming European Championships
People from Súdwest-Fryslân
Paralympic swimmers of the Netherlands
Sportspeople from Friesland
21st-century Dutch women